Rand Ravich is a film and television director, writer, and producer. He wrote and directed the 1999 science fiction thriller The Astronaut's Wife, starring Johnny Depp and Charlize Theron. He was a producer on the film Confessions of a Dangerous Mind, and also wrote the screenplays for the Candyman sequel Candyman: Farewell to the Flesh and the 1997 movie The Maker. Ravich is the creator of the NBC television drama series Life. He was also the show's executive producer and one of the writers. He created the 2014 NBC thriller drama Crisis.

He attended Arthur L. Johnson Regional High School, but graduated from Solomon Schechter, a small Jewish day school, before attending Haverford College in Pennsylvania, graduating in 1984. He majored in Philosophy, studying with Richard J. Bernstein, Aryeh Kosman, and Paul Desjardins. Professor Desjardin's name, and many other references to Haverford, crop up regularly in Life). While at Haverford, Rand came under the tutelage of Professor Bob Butman, who fostered Rand's creative interests and pushed him on the path to his writing career. Ravich wrote also the Screenplay for the Fox Television Network drama-horror series Second Chance. which is executive produced along with Howard Gordon. He wrote and executive produced the pilot episode, which was directed by Michael Cuesta.

Filmography

References

External links

American film producers
American male screenwriters
American male television writers
American television producers
American television writers
Jewish American screenwriters
Living people
Place of birth missing (living people)
Year of birth missing (living people)
21st-century American Jews